The Glebe was a literary magazine edited by Alfred Kreymborg and Man Ray from 1913 to 1914. The first issue was published from Grantwood, New Jersey while the rest of the run was published in New York by Albert & Charles Boni. Ten issues were produced, with a circulation of 300.  Issue number 5 comprised the first anthology of Imagism: Des Imagistes.

Issues and Contributors
Vol. 1, No. 1 - September 1913 - Adolf Wolff: Songs, Sighs and Curses (collected poems).
Vol. 1, No. 2 - October 1913 - Wallace E. Baker: Diary of a Suicide (diary).
Vol. 1, No. 3 - December 1913 - Charles Demuth: The Azure Adder (play).
Vol. 1, No. 4 - January 1914 - Leonid Andreyev: Love of One's Neighbor (play, translated by Thomas Seltzer)
Vol. 1, No. 5 - February 1914 - Ezra Pound (editor): Des Imagistes: An Anthology (poetry by 11 authors)
Vol. 1, No. 6 - March 1914 - Alfred Kreymborg: Erna Vitek (novel).

Vol. 2, No. 1 - April 1914 - Horace L. Traubel: Collects (essays).
Vol. 2, No. 2 - September 1914 - George W. Cronyn: Poems 
Vol. 2, No. 3 - October 1914 - Frank Wedekind: Erdgeist (Earth Spirit; play in verse translated by Samuel A. Eliot, Jr.).
Vol. 2. No. 4 - November 1914 - Frank Wedekind: Pandora's Box (play in verse translated by Samuel A. Eliot, Jr.).

See also
 1913 in poetry
 1914 in poetry

References

 Suzanne Churchill: Making Space for Others: A History of a Modernist Little Magazine. In: Journal of Modern Literature, Volume 22, No. 1, 1998, p. 53, note 26.
 Jay Bochner: The Glebe. In: Edward E. Chielens (editor): American Literary Magazines, pp. 135–139.
 The Glebe archive at Blue Mountain Project

Defunct literary magazines published in the United States
Magazines established in 1913
Magazines disestablished in 1914
1913 establishments in New Jersey
Magazines published in New Jersey
Magazines published in New York City
1914 disestablishments in New York (state)